Sabatinca caustica is a species of moth belonging to the family Micropterigidae. It was described by Edward Meyrick in 1912. It is endemic to New Zealand and is found in both Southland and at Stewart Island / Rakiura. The adults of this species are variable in appearance with some specimens being mainly white on their forewings while others have forewings that are a more mottled purple-brown colour. Adults are on the wing from the start of October until the middle of December. Larvae feed on the surface of leafy liverworts.

Taxonomy 
This species was first described by Edward Meyrick in 1912 using specimens collected in October at Seaward Moss, Invercargill by Alfred Philpott. The lectotype specimen, designated by J. S. Dugdale in 1988, is held at the Natural History Museum, London. In 2014 George Gibbs synonymised S. barbarica with S. caustica arguing that S. caustica is extremely variable in appearance and that the morphological and molecular evidence does not support the separation of these taxa.

Description

Meyrick described the adults of the species as follows:

The adults of this species are variable in appearance with some specimens being mainly white on their forewings while others have forewings that are a more mottled purple-brown colour.

Distribution

This species is endemic to New Zealand. This species is found in Southland, including in the Takitimu Mountains, and at Stewart Island / Rakiura.

Behaviour 
This species is on the wing from the start of October until the middle of December.

Host species and habitat
Larvae feed on the surface of leafy liverworts.

References

Micropterigidae
Moths described in 1912
Endemic fauna of New Zealand
Moths of New Zealand
Taxa named by Edward Meyrick
Endemic moths of New Zealand